Barrister Parvateesam is a 1940 Telugu comedy-drama film directed by H. M. Reddy. It is based on the Telugu novel Barrister Parvateesam (1924) written by Mokkapati Narasimha Sastry.

Casting
The title role of Parvateesam is played by Lanka Satyam. This was his second film. His first was Amma, directed by Niranjan Pal. He worked as assistant to director R. Prakash. G. Varalakshmi got the female lead role unexpectedly. Director Prakash saw her, when she was acting in the stage play Sakkubai in Rajahmundry, called her for a make-up test, and gave her the role of wife of Parvateesam. She was 12 years old. She sang two songs in the film. Kasturi Sivarao did two roles as a dentist and a rickshaw puller.

References

External links
 

1940 films
1940 comedy-drama films
1940s Telugu-language films
Films directed by H. M. Reddy
Films based on Indian novels
Indian black-and-white films
Indian comedy-drama films